is an anime based on the Belgian comic strip Cubitus. It is the first TV anime to be produced by anime studio J.C. Staff. It consisted of 52 two-part episodes the running time of 20 minutes in total, and it originally aired from 5 April 1988 to 27 March 1989. The show aired in the USA on The Family Channel in 1989.

Plot

Wowser is a large white dog who has a big appetite and lives with his owner Professor Dinghy, a genius inventor. They live next door to Beatrice, an old lady with an apron; Linda Lovely and her brother Bob; and Ratso Catso, a black-and-white cat who often ruins Wowser's day or sabotages Professor Dinghy's inventions.

Characters
 Wowser is the main character. A large, white dog, he has a good-natured  personality but a humongous appetite who often tries to have a good day, only to get annoyed by Ratso or Beatrice. He often tests out Dinghy's inventions. Japanese voice actor: Naoki Tatsuta. English voice actor: Jeff Winkless.
 Professor Dinghy is Wowser's owner who has a big white moustache and wears a pink sweater. He is a genius inventor, although his eccentric creations usually backfire on him due to people using the wrong way or Ratso interfering with them. He mostly likes to use Wowser to check his inventions.  Japanese voice actor: Kaneta Kimotsuki. English voice actor: Simon Prescott.
 Ratso Catso is an annoying black-and-white neighbourhood cat who appears to be Wowser's rival or his friend for some reason, and often pretends to be nice and sabotages the Professor's inventions. Japanese voice actress: Rika Matsumoto. English voice actor: Robert Axelrod.
 Linda Lovely (Cherry (チェリー Cherī) is a teenager who seems to take quite a fancy interest towards Wowser. Wowser and Dinghy also seem to have a crush on her. Japanese voice actress: Mīna Tominaga. English voice actress: Wendee Swan.
 Bob Lovely is Linda's young little brother. Japanese voice actress: Tarako. English voice actress: Barbara Goodson.
 Beatrice is a rather plump, tall, bossy, middle-aged woman who is often very rude to Wowser. She also seems to have a secret crush on Dinghy. Japanese voice actress: Kazuko Sugiyama. English voice actress: Melanie MacQueen.
 Officer Whistle is a policeman who keeps a whistle in his mouth which is used to tell people off when there is trouble about. Japanese voice actor: Kōichi Yamadera. English voice actor: Mike Reynolds.

Foreign versions
The English-language version was produced by Saban Entertainment. Retitled Wowser, the series aired in 1989 on The Family Channel. The English dub changed the names of the characters and replaced the original music. Some scenes were removed or edited due to their violent or sexual manner:
 one scene in "The Hip Hippos" was removed, where Professor Dinghy beats Wowser on the head;
 another scene in "Slap Happy Birthday" was removed, where a chicken attacks Beatrice, causing her to crash and rip and ruin her dress;
 in "Self-Cleaning Machine", an entire scene is censored where Dinghy's vacuum backfires, Linda's clothes fly out the window and land in parts of town. A bra lands on a male statue's chest and he covers himself.

In the United Kingdom, Wowser aired on ITV and later on Channel 4 in the early and mid-1990s. Two videos of the series were released in two volumes by Stylus Video. In the USA, in 1990 and 1991, Wowser was released on video in four volumes in episodes with running times of 30 minutes and 60 minutes. In Canada, it aired on YTV between 1990 and 1993.

Songs

Japanese version
Opening song:

"Fly away - Yume no Hikouki" Sung by Mitsuko Horie

Lyrics by Arisu Satou

Composed by Takanori Arisawa

Arranged by Seichi Kyouda

Ending song:

"GO! GO! My Friend" Sung by Mitsuko Horie

Lyrics by Arisu Satou

Composed by Takanori Arisawa

Arranged by Seichi Kyouda

Theme Song Production by Nippon Columbia

References

External links
 
 

1988 anime television series debuts
Japanese children's animated comedy television series
Children's television characters
Comedy anime and manga
Animated television series about cats
Animated television series about dogs
Television series based on Belgian comics
Anime based on comics
ITV children's television shows
TV Tokyo original programming
Television series by Saban Entertainment

ja:どんどんドメルとロン